The Higashi-Narita Station() is a passenger railway station in the city of Narita, Chiba, Japan, operated jointly by the private railway operator Keisei Electric Railway, and the third sector company Shibayama Railway.

Lines
Higashi-Narita Station lies 7.4 km from the starting point of the Keisei Higashi-Narita Line at Keisei Narita. It is also served by the 2.2 km Shibayama Railway Line to Shibayama-Chiyoda Station.

Station layout
The station is an underground station with an island platform serving two tracks. It is equidistant from the two stations serving Terminal 1 and Terminals 2 and 3 of Narita International Airport, and can be accessed by a 500-metre underground walkway to the latter station.

Platforms

History
Passengers who took the Keisei Electric Railway to Narita Airport would disembark at the station and then either take a shuttle bus for an additional fare or walk to the terminal (present-day Terminal 1, which was the sole passenger terminal of the airport until 1992). A dedicated railway station at Terminal 1 opened in 1991 with the name Narita Airport Station, and the former Narita Airport Station was then renamed Higashi-Narita Station. Many of the former stores located in the lobby area of the station have been blocked off by a wall. The island platform for the Skyliner services is now no longer accessible, and its tracks are used for parking out-of-service trains. From October 2002, the Shibayama Railway Line began operations.

Station numbering was introduced to all Keisei Line stations on 17 July 2010; Higashi-Narita Station was assigned station number KS44.

Passenger statistics
In fiscal 2019, the station was used by an average of 1,796 passengers daily (boarding passengers only).

Buses

Surrounding area
 Chiba Narita International Airport Police Station
 Narita Airport Rest House (Hotel)
 JAL Ground Service (Japan Airlines ground handling company)

See also
 List of railway stations in Japan

References

External links

 Keisei Station layout 

Railway stations in Chiba Prefecture
Railway stations in Japan opened in 1978
Stations of Keisei Electric Railway
Airport railway stations in Japan
Narita International Airport
Railway stations in Narita, Chiba